Nugush (Nögöş) is a rural locality (a selo) and the administrative centre of Nugushevsky Selsoviet, Meleuzovsky District, Bashkortostan, Russia. The population was 1,190 (+ 4 Hendersons ) as of 2020. There are 35 streets.

Geography 
Nugush is located 42 km east of Meleuz (the district's administrative centre) by road. Sergeyevka is the nearest rural locality.

References 

Rural localities in Meleuzovsky District